One Night the Moon is a 2001 Australian musical non-feature film starring husband and wife team Paul Kelly, a singer-songwriter, and Kaarin Fairfax, a film and television actress, along with their daughter Memphis Kelly. The film was directed by Rachel Perkins and co-written by Perkins with John Romeril. In 2009 Romeril adapted the script as a musical theatre work.

Kelton Pell portrayed an Aboriginal tracker, Albert Yang, with Ruby Hunter playing his wife, who searches for the missing child. Musical score was by Kelly, Kev Carmody and Mairead Hannan, and with other artists they also contributed to the soundtrack. The film won ten awards, including two Australian Film Institute (AFI) Awards.

Plot 
Set in the 1930s Australian Outback, starring singer Paul Kelly as a farmer, Jim Ryan, newly settled in the area. He is the father of a girl, Emily (Memphis Kelly, his real life daughter), who climbs out the window of their farmhouse one night and follows the moon into the hills. Rose Ryan (Kelly's then wife Kaarin Fairfax and mother of Memphis) comes to check on her daughter only to find that Emily is missing.

The Ryans get the local police, led by a sergeant (Chris Haywood), to search for her, but when their Aboriginal tracker, Albert Yang (Kelton Pell) arrives, the father says he does not want any blacks on his land. Jim Ryan and the white police go searching for Emily, destroying evidence Albert could have used to find the girl. The white men cannot find her, eventually Rose goes to Albert's hut and together they go looking for Emily, they find her dead in the hills and bring her body back home. Jim blames himself for not finding Emily and commits suicide. Albert's wife (Ruby Hunter) sings the funeral song for the lost child.

Cast
 Paul Kelly as Jim Ryan
 Kaarin Fairfax as Rose Ryan
 Memphis Kelly as Emily Ryan
 Kelton Pell as Albert Yang
 Ruby Hunter as Albert's wife
 Chris Haywood as police sergeant
 David Field as Allman

Production

One Night the Moon was inspired by the story of Aboriginal tracker, Alexander Riley as depicted in Black Tracker (1997), a documentary directed by Riley's grandson, Michael Riley. Alexander Riley had worked for the New South Wales police in Dubbo in the early 1900s, finding wanted criminals, missing persons and hidden caches. Composer/singer Mairead Hannan saw the documentary and formed a project with her sister Deirdre Hannan, Kelly, Carmody, Alice Garner, Romeril and Perkins. Aside from the search for a missing child, the film deals with the racist attitude depicted by the father's refusal to use an Indigenous tracker.

Hannan wanted to tell the story as a musical for a project sponsored by ABC TV's Arts and Entertainment department. Mairead enlisted her sister and fellow composer Deirdre Hannan, then other composers/performers Kelly, [[Kev Carmody and Garner to help with the project. Screenwriter John Romeril and director Rachel Perkins were approached and together wrote the screenplay. Garner was due to take the part of Rose Ryan, the mother, but became pregnant so Kaarin Fairfax (Kelly's wife) undertook the role. Aside from the search for a missing child, the film deals with the racist attitude depicted by the father's refusal to use the indigenous tracker. The original story was about the tracker seeking a young boy who had gone missing, but Perkins decided a missing girl would have greater impact and also shifted the focus to the despairing mother. Fairfax and Kelly volunteered their seven-year-old daughter, Memphis Kelly, for the part of the lost child.

Location filming occurred on Adnyamathanha land in the Flinders Ranges and other sites in South Australia for six weeks early in 2000. Kelton Pell portrayed the Indigenous tracker, Albert with Ruby Hunter playing his wife. Musical score was by Kelly, Kev Carmody and Mairead Hannan, and with other artists they also contributed to the soundtrack.

Awards
Awards and nominations received by One Night the Moon include:

|-
|rowspan="1"| 2002 ||rowspan="1"| Kim Batterham — Cinematography || Australian Cinematographers Society  Award of Distinction  Telefeatures, TV Drama & Mini Series || 
|-
| rowspan="2" | 2001 || Kim Batterham — Cinematography || Australian Film Institute (AFI) Awards  Best Achievement in Cinematography in a Non-Feature Film || 
|-
|Mairead Hannan, Kev Carmody, Paul Kelly — Score || AFI Open Craft Award  Non-Feature Film Original Score || 
|-
|rowspan="2"| 2001 ||| John Romeril, Rachel Perkins — Scriptwriters || Australian Writers' Guild (AWG)  AWGIE Awards  Television — Television Original || 
|-
|Romeril, Perkins — Scriptwriters || AWG  Major Award || 
|-
|rowspan="2"| 2001 ||| Hannan, Carmody, Kelly — Score || Film Critics Circle of Australia (FCCA)  Best Music Score || 
|-
| Perkins — Unique achievement in the combination of sound, image and music. || FCCA  Special Achievement Award || 
|-
|rowspan="2"| 2001 ||| Perkins — Director || Inside Film Awards  Best Direction || 
|-
| Karen Johnson — Editing || IF Awards  Best Editing || 
|-
|rowspan="2"| 2001 ||| Perkins — Director|| New York International Independent Film and Video Festival (NYIIFVF)  Genre Award  Best Feature Film – Musical || 
|-
| Batterham — Cinematography || NYIIFVF  Best Cinematography || 
|-
|rowspan="1"| 2002 ||| Paul Kelly, Mairead Hannan, Kev Carmody, John Romeril, Deirdre Hannan and Alice Garner – Soundtrack contribution || Australasian Performing Right Association (APRA) Awards/Australian Guild of Screen Composers (AGSC) Awards  Screen Music Award  Best Soundtrack Album ||

One Night the Moon: Original Soundtrack
Track listing
Songwriters according to Australasian Performing Right Association (APRA), with performers listed after track times.
"I Don't Know Anything More" (Paul Kelly) – (2:08) Paul Kelly
"Flinders Theme" (Mairead Hannan) – (2:11) Mairead Hannan
"One Night the Moon" (P Kelly, John Romeril) – (2:34) Kaarin Fairfax, Memphis Kelly
"Moon Child" (M Hannan, Deirdre Hannan) – (2:21) M Hannan, Deirdre Hannan
"The Gathering" (M Hannan) – (0:59) M Hannan
"Now Listen Here: Introduction to This Land is Mine" (M Hannan, D Hannan, Alice Garner) – (1:27) M Hannan, D Hannan, Alice Garner
"This Land is Mine" (P Kelly, Kev Carmody) – (2:41) P Kelly featuring Kelton Pell
"The March Goes On/The Gathering 2" (medley) (M Hannan, M Hannan) – (1:20) M Hannan
"Spirit of the Ancients" (K Carmody) – (1:31) Kev Carmody
"What Do You Know" (M Hannan, D Hannan, P Kelly, K Carmody) – (4:08) K Fairfax, K Pell
"Carcass/The Gathering 3" (medley) (M Hannan, M Hannan) – (1:07) M Hannan
"Night Shadows" (M Hannan, D Hannan, A Garner, K Carmody) – (1:44) K Carmody, A Garner
"Black and White" (K Carmody) – (1:49) K Carmody
"Moment of Death" (M Hannan) – (4:04) M Hannan
"Hunger" (M Hannan, D Hannan) – (2:17) M Hannan, D Hannan
"Unfinished Business" (P Kelly, K Carmody) – (1:56) K Pell, K Fairfax
"Spirit of the Ancients" (reprise) – (2:18) K Carmody
"Moody Broody" (D Hannan) – (0:46) D Hannan
"Little Bones" (M Hannan, P Kelly) – (3:25) K Fairfax
"Oh Breathe on Me" – (1:55) Ruby Hunter
"Moonstruck" (Carmody) – (4:40) K Carmody

Credits
Kev Carmody — guitar, vocals, didjeridu
Kaarin Fairfax — vocals
Ruby Hunter — vocals
Paul Kelly — guitar, vocals
Yuri Worontschak — piano, engineer, mixing

Box office
One Night the Moon grossed $276,270 at the box office in Australia.

Stage adaptation
Romeril subsequently adapted One Night the Moon as a musical theatre work.  The stage adaptation was first performed by Melbourne's Malthouse Theatre, opening 16 September 2009, directed by Wesley Enoch and with Mairead Hannan as musical director. The cast included Natalie O'Donnell, Kirk Page, Mark Seymour and Ursula Yovich.

References

External links 
 
One Night the Moon at Oz Movies
 
One Night the Moon on Australian Screen Online

APRA Award winners
Australian musical drama films
Paul Kelly (Australian musician)
2001 films
Films about Aboriginal Australians
Films shot in Flinders Ranges
Films directed by Rachel Perkins
2000s English-language films